Frank Tolan (May 1854 – 1899) was an American private in the U.S. Army who served with the 7th U.S. Cavalry during the Great Sioux War of 1876–77. He was one of twenty-two soldiers received the Medal of Honor for gallantry, volunteering to carry water to wounded soldiers on Reno Hill, at the Battle of the Little Bighorn on June 25, 1876.

Biography
Tolan was born in Malone, New York in May 1854 and spent much of his early life as a farmer. At age 21, he enlisted in the United States Army in Boston, Massachusetts as a private with the 7th U.S. Cavalry Regiment on August 31, 1875.

Tolan saw action in the Montana Territory during the Great Sioux War of 1876–77 and, on June 25, 1876, was present at the Battle of the Little Bighorn against Chief Sitting Bull and the Sioux. A member of Company D under Captain Thomas Weir, he and several other soldiers volunteered to carry water from the Little Bighorn River to wounded soldiers at the Reno-Benteen site "under a most galling fire". He and the other Little Bighorn water carriers were among the twenty-two soldiers recommended for the Medal of Honor, Tolan officially receiving his award on October 5, 1878.>

Although disappearing from record soon after his discharge around 1880, the Boston Globe reported in 1887 that its military editor was in possession of Tolan's MOH which "was obtained by a comrade from a squaw".

Medal of Honor citation
Rank and organization: Private, Company D, 7th U.S. Cavalry. Place and date: At Little Big Horn, Mont., 25 June 1876. Entered service at: Boston, Mass. Birth: Malone, N.Y. Date of issue: 5 October 1878.

Citation:

Voluntarily brought water to the wounded under fire.

See also

List of Medal of Honor recipients for the Indian Wars

References

Further reading
Carroll, John M., ed. They Rode with Custer: A Biographical Directory of the Men That Rode with General George A. Custer. Mattituck, New York: J.M. Carroll & Company, 1993.
Williams, Roger L. Military Register of Custer's Last Command. Norman, Oklahoma: Arthur H. Clark Company, 2009.

External links

1854 births
1899 deaths
American military personnel of the Indian Wars
United States Army Medal of Honor recipients
United States Army soldiers
People from Malone, New York
American Indian Wars recipients of the Medal of Honor